20th Century is the third solo album by John Sykes, released in 1997. The record is a companion piece to Sykes' second solo album Loveland, released that same year. While Loveland was composed of all ballads, 20th Century features heavier material, more akin to Sykes' previous work with Blue Murder and Whitesnake. After releasing Loveland, Sykes felt he was perceived as having gone "soft" by audiences. As a response he decided to record 20th Century. Sykes' goal with the album was to also have shorter and more "concise" songs, in a similar vain to Van Halen's first album. The album's title was chosen because of the impending end of the 20th century.

Track listing 
All songs written and composed by John Sykes.

Personnel 
Credits are adapted from the album's liner notes.

References

1997 albums
John Sykes albums
Albums produced by John Sykes